is a passenger railway station located in the city of Toyooka, Hyōgo Prefecture, Japan, operated by West Japan Railway Company (JR West).

Lines

Station layout
The station consists of one ground-level island platform with an elevated station building. The station has a Midori no Madoguchi staffed ticket office.

Platforms

Adjacent stations

History
Ebara Station opened on July 10, 1909. With the privatization of the Japan National Railways (JNR) on April 1, 1987, the station came under the aegis of the West Japan Railway Company.

Passenger statistics
In fiscal 2017, the station was used by an average of 587 passengers daily

Surrounding area
 Maruyama River
 Tajima Kokubun-ji Ruins
 Tajima Kokufu / Kokubunjikan

See also
List of railway stations in Japan

References

External links

 Station Official Site

Railway stations in Hyōgo Prefecture
Sanin Main Line
Railway stations in Japan opened in 1909
Toyooka, Hyōgo